Encarna Sant-Celoni i Verger (Tavernes de la Valldigna, La Safor, 1959) is a Spanish narrative writer, poet and translator. In 1983 she won the Ciutat de Cullera prize, with Dotze contes i una nota necrològica, and in 1985 she obtained the prestigious Premi Joanot Martorell de Gandia, with her novel Siamangorina. She is a member of AELC and has translated, among other works, Els mil i un quarts d'hora, by Thomas-Simon Gueullette (Editorial Moll, 2008), and has co-translated from Danish the anthology Digte-POEMES, by Tove Ditlevsen (Alfons el Magnànim, 1995), together with Anne Marie Dinesen. And from Arabic she has translated all the cassidas in existence today of the poets of Al Andalus in the work Perles de la nit. Poetes andalusines, together with Margarida Castells (Adesiara Editorial, 2013).

In 2004 she was awarded the Vila de Puçol prize and in 2008 she published the anthology Eròtiques i despentinades. Un recorregut de cent anys per la poesia catalana amb veu de dona, with artwork by Maria Montes (Arola Editors). She is also co-author of two language texts, Reciclatge (1992) and Accent greu (2000). She has also collaborated with various magazines, journals and publications as well as taking part in several collective acts of homage and new books concerned with poetry in particular.

Works 
Novel
 Siamangorina. Ajuntament de Gandia. Gandia, 1986
 Al cor, la quimereta. Tabarca llibres. València, 2003 i 2009
 Milonga de tardor. Òmicron. Badalona, 2014

Poetry
 Sénia de petits vicis. La Forest d'Arana. València, 1989
 Arran de pantomima. Amós Belinchon. València, 1991
 Dèria i fal·lera. La Forest d'Arana. València, 1996
 Sediments d'albaïna i maregassa. Brosquil Edicions. València, 2002

Narrative writing
 Dotze contes i una nota necrològica. El Cingle. València,1985
 Guarda't dels jocs del destí. Brosquil Edicions. València, 2005

External links 
 To Edith Pargeter, alias Ellis Peters, In Memoriam and as a thoughtful tribute. In "Qui quaerit, invenit", brother Cadfael receives a very special command from Hildegard of Bingen : Qui Quaerit, invenit, 2015 (Trad. John Joseph Vélez): investigate the death of Richardis von Stade. https://www.escriptors.cat/sites/default/files/inline-files/encarna-sant-celoni-Qui-quaerit-invenit-english.pdf
 Story about Charlotte Perkins Gilman, in catalan : http://opinions.laveupv.com/el-conte-del-diumenge/blog/les-possibilitats-de-la-parra-dencarna-sant-celoni-i-verger
 Story about Charlotte Perkins Gilman, in english: The possibilities of the vine, 2016 (Trad. Fiona Kelso) : https://www.escriptors.cat/autors/santcelonie/possibilities-vine-encarna-santceloni.pdf
 AELC: http://www.escriptors.cat/autors/santcelonie/pagina.php?id_sec=1482
 Selection of Catalan poetry. Noves Generacions: http://www.uoc.edu/lletra/especials/folch/esantcel.htm
 Who's who: http://www.qeqculturavalenciana.es/cultura/sant-celoni-i-verger-encarna
 Saforíssims http://www.saforissims.org/tag/encarna-sant-celoni/
 Recital in London, Recital d'Eròtiques i despentinades: London, https://web.archive.org/web/20150218115526/http://www.sas.ac.uk/videos-and-podcasts/culture-language-literature/erotiques-i-despetinades
 Milonga de tardor. Interview: http://www.promoartyou.com/ca/noticies/2015/04/20/milonga-de-tardor-el-projecte-de-encarna-sant-celoni-escriptora 
 Nora Almada: "Eròtica catalana. Dones que escriuen poesia", Literata, desembre de 2008. Interview:https://web.archive.org/web/20160303195745/http://www.escriptors.cat/autors/santcelonie/entrevista_literata.pdf
 Pepa Úbeda: Estrictament confidencial, Ràdio Klara, 101.4 FM, València, 29 de desembre de 2014. Interview: http://www.ivoox.com/estrictament-confidencial-encarna-sant-celoni-i-verger-audios-mp3_rf_3914535_1.html

Living people
1959 births
People from Valencia
Spanish women poets